By Berwin Banks is a 1920 British silent romance film directed by Sidney Morgan and starring Langhorn Burton, Eileen Magrath and J. Denton-Thompson.

Cast
 Langhorn Burton - Cardo Wynne 
 Eileen Magrath - Valmai Powell 
 J. Denton-Thompson - Owen Davies 
 Charles W. Somerset - Essec Powell
 Arthur Lennard - Reverend Menrig Wynne 
 Judd Green - Joe Powell 
 Charles Levey - Reverend Gwynne Ellis

References

External links
 

1920 films
Films directed by Sidney Morgan
1920s romance films
British silent feature films
British black-and-white films
British romance films
1920s English-language films
1920s British films